The Alexandria Archaeology Museum is an institution dedicated to the preservation and study of the archaeological heritage of Alexandria, Virginia.

According to the National Park Service, the museum exhibits feature's 10,000 years of the human history of Alexandria.

In addition to artifacts, the museum also jointly holds a collection of 160 oral histories in conjunction with two other institutions, the Black History Mureum and the Lyceum.

See also
 Torpedo Factory Art Center

References

Buildings and structures in Alexandria, Virginia
Tourist attractions in Alexandria, Virginia
2000 establishments in Virginia
Museums in Virginia